The 1992 Portuguese Grand Prix was a Formula One motor race held at Autódromo do Estoril on 27 September 1992. It was the fourteenth round of the 1992 Formula One World Championship.

Nigel Mansell won the race from pole position, in the process setting new records for most wins (nine) and most points (108) in one season, with McLaren drivers Gerhard Berger and Ayrton Senna second and third.

Pre-race
The Fondmetal team did not arrive in Estoril for the race, suffering financial problems. Team boss Gabriele Rumi attempted to bring in paydriver Giuseppe Bugatti to help ease the team's cashflow problems but this was not enough to allow the team to race. Although they hoped at the time to return for the final two races of the season in Japan and Australia, they ultimately proved unable to do so. This was the third race in succession where a team exited Formula One, after Brabham and Andrea Moda at the previous two races. Brabham had also hoped to return as the team was put up for sale, but before this weekend their full withdrawal was announced.

Fondmetal's absence meant that there were only 26 cars on the entry list, so this Grand Prix was the first since 1987 in which all cars automatically qualified for the race, regardless of qualifying lap times.

Qualifying

Qualifying report
The top six on the grid lined up in pairs, with the Williams, McLaren and Benetton drivers occupying the first three rows. Nigel Mansell took pole from Riccardo Patrese, with Ayrton Senna, Gerhard Berger, Michael Schumacher and Martin Brundle lining up behind.

Qualifying classification

Race

Race report
The race is often remembered for the accident between Berger and Mansell's Williams team-mate Riccardo Patrese. Intending to make a pit stop, Berger moved towards the right side of the track at the beginning of the start/finish straight, with Patrese following in his slipstream. Failing to realise Berger's intentions, Patrese swerved to avoid him, but his right front wheel hit Berger's left rear and the Williams was launched into the air, almost hitting a pedestrian bridge over the track. Patrese escaped the accident shaken but unhurt, and neither driver was punished by the stewards. The debris from the crash, however, caused numerous other incidents, with Michael Schumacher and Pierluigi Martini suffering punctures, and JJ Lehto suffering slight injury as the driveshaft of the Williams went through the undertray of his Dallara, hitting him on the leg and eventually being forced to retire after 51 laps.

This race was the last time a Honda-powered car set the fastest lap until Fernando Alonso repeated the achievement in the 2016 Italian Grand Prix, and the last time McLaren would score a double points result with Honda engines until the 2015 Hungarian Grand Prix.

Race classification

Championship standings after the race
Bold text indicates the World Champions.

Drivers' Championship standings

Constructors' Championship standings

 Note: Only the top five positions are included for both sets of standings.

References

Portuguese Grand Prix
Portuguese Grand Prix
Grand Prix
Portuguese Grand Prix